Woodlawn, Arkansas may refer to:
Woodlawn, Cleveland County, Arkansas, a census-designated place in Cleveland County
Woodlawn, Lonoke County, Arkansas, an unincorporated community in Lonoke County